The Birmingham–Peterborough line is a cross-country railway line in the United Kingdom, linking Birmingham,  and , via ,  and 

Since the Beeching Axe railway closures in the 1960s, it is the only direct railway link between the West Midlands and the East of England. It is also strategically important for freight, as it allows container trains from the Port of Felixstowe to travel to the Midlands and beyond.

History
The present route is an amalgamation of lines that were built by separate companies. The sections were:

The line from Whitacre junction to Nuneaton was built by the Midland Railway, and opened in 1864.
The line between Nuneaton and Wigston was built by the South Leicestershire Railway and was also completed in 1864. The South Leicestershire Railway was taken over by the London and North Western Railway in 1867.
The section between Wigston and  via Leicester was built for the Midland Counties Railway (a forerunner of the Midland Railway) in 1840. It is now part of the Midland Main Line.
The eastern section, the Syston and Peterborough Railway, was built for the Midland Railway and opened in 1846.

The entire route became part of the London, Midland and Scottish Railway in the 1923 grouping, and the LMS was nationalised on 1 January 1948 as part of British Railways.

Most Birmingham-Leicester passenger trains were taken over by diesel units from 14 April 1958, taking about 79 minutes between the two cities.

In 1977 the Parliamentary Select Committee on Nationalised Industries recommended considering electrification of more of Britain's rail network. By 1979 BR presented a range of options to do so by 2000, some of which included the Birmingham to Peterborough Line. Under the 1979–90 Conservative governments that succeeded the 1976–79 Labour government, the proposal was not implemented.

The route was privatised in the 1990s as part of Railtrack and is now part of Network Rail.

Services
From 1986 the first Sprinter trains operated on the line, Class 150s, subsequently replaced by Class 156 SuperSprinter units from 1988.

East Midlands Railway operates a handful of services along the section between Syston and Peterborough (serving  and ) as part of its London  service via .

Cross Country services are exclusively worked by Class 170 Turbostar units, while EMR use Class 158 Express Sprinter trains on services to Norwich and Class 222 Meridian trains for London services. In addition, EMR also operate an evening  to Nottingham service which is worked by a Class 153  SuperSprinter.

Freight trains use the route between the West Midlands and the East Anglia, primarily container trains to the Port of Felixstowe and sand trains to King's Lynn.

Current developments

Felixstowe and Nuneaton freight capacity scheme 

The Felixstowe–Nuneaton railway upgrade is a large project with a number of elements that will allow more railfreight traffic between the Haven ports and the Midlands. The work was prompted by the 'Felixstowe South' expansion at the Port of Felixstowe. It is also in response to the predicted increase in the number of high-cube (Hi-cube) shipping containers arriving at the ports that cannot currently be accommodated on the route. The percentage of high-cube containers is expected to increase from 30% in 2007 to 50% in 2012. Without loading gauge enhancement these larger containers would have to be transported by road or via a longer rail route via London that is already operating at capacity. Network Rail completed the gauge enhancement from Ipswich to Peterborough in 2008.
Work will take place in three phases:
 Phase 1
 Nuneaton North Chord (see below)
 Peterborough to Nuneaton Gauge (W10) (see below)
Phase 2a
 Doubling 8 km of the Felixstowe Branch Line
 Doubling the Ipswich to Ely Line between Soham Junction and Ely
 Raising speed restrictions for freight trains between Ipswich and Peterborough
Phase 2b
Capacity enhancement Peterborough to Nuneaton during CP5

The work, detailed in the Network Rail Freight Route Utilisation Strategy, should be completed by 2014. at an estimated cost of £291 million.

The government is providing £80 million and it will also receive £5 million from Network Rail and £1 million from the East of England Development Agency. It has been estimated that the scheme would take 225,000 lorries off the road.

In February 2010 Network Rail confirmed that it would construct the 1 km 'Bacon Factory Chord' in Ipswich to allow trains to travel between the East Suffolk line and the Ipswich–Ely line without reversing into Ipswich Station and to also perform work to increase capacity between Ely–Peterborough line at a total cost of £50m. It was stated that the work would 'take 750,000 lorries off the roads'.

Peterborough to Nuneaton gauge
Enhancement of a section of the Birmingham–Peterborough line involving the reconstruction of 14 bridges, 11 tracking lowering/slewing schemes and one accommodation bridge. The cost is estimated at £40.5 million. The West Coast Main Line is already cleared to W10 and the route from Nuneaton to Birmingham is already cleared to W12. W10 gauge clearance was achieved on 4 April 2011 and GBRf trains requiring W10 gauge began using the route that day.

Nuneaton North Chord
The Nuneaton North Chord was completed and opened on 15 November 2012. The chord allows freight traffic approaching Nuneaton from Felixstowe via the Birmingham–Peterborough line to proceed north on the West Coast Main Line without conflicting with southbound main-line trains. It consists of a one-mile chord from the existing flyover over the West Coast Main Line to join the line to the north. The cost of this work was £25.6 million. A Transport & Works Act Order for the Nuneaton North Chord was granted by the Secretary of State for Transport in July 2010. Work began in mid-2011.

References

Sources

Rail transport in Warwickshire
Rail transport in Leicestershire
Rail transport in Lincolnshire
Rail transport in Cambridgeshire
Transport in Peterborough
Transport in Rutland
Railway lines in the East of England
Railway lines in the East Midlands
Railway lines in the West Midlands (region)
Standard gauge railways in England